Noumenon,  plur. noumena, is a modern philosophic word used in many languages. It is borrowed without change from the Greek present middle and passive participle of the contract verb, noein (no-e-ein), “to know.” The present participle has a continuous aspect, so that noumenon means more exactly “a thing that is currently being continuously known.” It may mean specifically:

Philosophy and religion
 Noumenon, the conceived, as opposed to phainomenon, the sensed (Plato) or the inferred, or thing-in-itself, as opposed to phenomenon, the experienced thing (Kant)
 Noumenon, translation of Sat (Sanskrit),  the real, as in the Pavamana Mantra
 Noumenon, as universal spiritual essence, God in Buddhism
 Noumenon, the transcendent Brahman
 Noumenon, realised by denial in Apophatic theology
 Noumenon, translation of Li, one of the Four Dharmadhātu of Tu-shun

Arts and entertainment

Music
 Noumena (band), a Finnish melodic death metal band
 Noumenon, a 2005 album by Absurd Minds
 "Noumenon", a song by Nevermore from the 2003 album Enemies of Reality
 "Noumenon and Phenomenon", a song by Scar Symmetry from the 2009 album Dark Matter Dimensions

Other arts and entertainment
 Noumenon, a 1953 choreography by Alwin Nikolais
 Noumenon, a 1992 work by Evan Oakley
 Noumenon, an unknown beast in the drawings of Charles Avery
 Noumenon, a 2006 sculpture by Steve Brudniak
 Noumenon, a 2017 novel by Marina J. Lostetter

See also
 Numen (disambiguation)
 Numinous (disambiguation)